"System Overload" is a garage rock song by New Zealand Rock and Roll band The Datsuns. It is the second single off the album Smoke & Mirrors.

It was released on both Vinyl and Compact Disk in 2006.

It is typical of The Datsuns style. With loud guitar, a lead break and dominant vocals.

In 2013, the song was used in the video game Saints Row IV in the fictional in-game radio station Generation X.

Track listing
"System Overload"
"Don't shine your light on me"
"Killer Bees"

2006 singles
The Datsuns songs